Society Secrets is a 1921 American silent satire film, directed by Leo McCarey. It stars Eva Novak, Gertrude Claire, and George Verrell, and was released in February 1921. It marked McCarey's directorial debut. He didn't make a further feature film for eight years as he concentrated on writing and directing shorts.

Cast list
 Eva Novak as Louise
 Gertrude Claire as Mrs. Kerran
 George Verrell as Amos Kerran
 Clarissa Selwynne as Aunt
 William Buckley as Arthur
 Ethel Ritchie as Maybelle
 Lee Shumway as George
 Carl Stockdale as Squire
 Lucy Donohue as Squire's wife

References

External links 
 
 
 

American satirical films
Universal Pictures films
Films directed by Leo McCarey
American silent feature films
American black-and-white films
1921 comedy films
1921 films
1920s American films